The 55th Guksu has been won by Cho Hanseung, who defeated the defending champion Choi Cheol-han 3:2.

Title Match

Challenger Tournament

References 

2011 in go
Go competitions in South Korea